Kevin J. O'Toole (born October 5, 1964) is an American Republican Party politician, who served in the New Jersey Senate. O'Toole represented the 40th legislative district, which included parts of Bergen, Essex, Morris, and Passaic counties from 2008 to 2017.

O'Toole was elected to the Assembly in 1995 and re-elected five times. He served in the Senate from May 2001 to January 2002, and was elected to the Senate again on November 6, 2007. O'Toole serves in the Senate on the Budget and Appropriations Committee and on the Senate Judiciary Government Committee. He also served as the Senate Minority Whip.

In January 2016, O'Toole announced that he would not seek re-election in 2017. In February 2017, Governor Chris Christie nominated him to a six-year term on the Board of Commissioners of the Port Authority of New York and New Jersey to succeed Pat Schuber. The State Senate confirmed his nomination in March 2017, though O'Toole indicated that it would take a few months to wrap up his time in the Senate before he took office as a commissioner. 

O'Toole resigned from the State Senate on July 1, 2017 to begin his term as Port Authority commissioner. The following month, he was selected as the chairman of the agency's Board of Directors by his fellow commissioners, succeeding John J. Degnan, who had served in that position since July 2014.

Early life and career
O'Toole was born in Cedar Grove, New Jersey to an Irish American father and Korean mother who met during the Korean War. He graduated from Cedar Grove High School and earned a B.A. in Political Science / Public Administration and a J.D. in 1989 from Seton Hall University. He later passed the bar exam in 1989 and served a clerkship in the office of the State Attorney General.
 
At the age of 25, O'Toole began his political career by serving on the Cedar Grove Township Council from 1989 to 1996. He was elected as its Mayor from 1990 to 1991, 1993 to 1994 and from 1995 to 1996. O'Toole was later elected as Chairman of the Essex County Republican Committee from 1997 to 2011.

In 1995, O'Toole was elected to the General Assembly, the lower house of the New Jersey State Legislature, representing the 21st Legislative District. He was appointed as the Assembly's Deputy Republican Leader from 2004 to 2008 and was the Assistant Majority Leader from 1998 to 2001. O'Toole was briefly appointed to the State Senate in 2001, where he served for eight months before redistricting forced him into a different legislative district.

In 2007, O'Toole defeated Democrat John Zunic to win election to the New Jersey Senate seat in the 40th District, filling the seat vacated by Henry McNamara, a fellow Republican who had represented the district since 1985. O'Toole's running mates David C. Russo and Scott Rumana also won election.

After his brother's death in 2001, O'Toole retired from his position as Chairman of the Essex County Republican Committee and recommended that County Party Executive Director Al Barlas from Bloomfield succeed him. Barlas serves as O'Toole's Chief of Staff.

By profession, O'Toole is an attorney with the firm of O'Toole Fernandez Weiner Vanlieu LLC. Senator O'Toole and his wife, Bethany, have two children, Kevin Jr. and Ryan Marie.

State legislator
O'Toole has sponsored laws to reform welfare, strengthen domestic violence statutes, increase penalties on businesses and individuals who engage in discrimination, mandate insurance coverage for mammography and for treatment of breast and cervical cancer, preserve the state's drinking water supply through the preservation of Sterling Forest, and create more government transparency. In the state legislature, O'Toole has been a proponent of ethics reform in New Jersey government. He was the original sponsor of legislation creating pension reform in New Jersey. He has sponsored legislation to streamline government, promote education, protect the environment, and lower property taxes. O'Toole was one of the primary sponsors of pre-paid college education expense program (529 college savings plan) and legislation that would prohibit campaign contributions from vendors who have government contracts.

In 2013, O'Toole challenged Thomas Kean Jr. for the leadership of Republicans in the Senate. O'Toole was backed by Governor Chris Christie, reportedly because of disagreements with Kean in regards to strategy during the elections that year, where no gains occurred during the Senate elections despite Christie winning re-election with over 60% of the vote. Kean held on to his position of Senate Minority Leader in a 10–6 caucus vote. In the following session, Kean removed O'Toole from his position as Minority Whip.

District 40
Each of the forty districts in the New Jersey Legislature has one representative in the New Jersey Senate and two members in the New Jersey General Assembly. The other representatives from the 40th district for the 2016-2017 Legislative Session are:
Assemblyman David C. Russo
Assemblyman Kevin J. Rooney

Election history

40th District

21st District

References

External links
Senator Kevin O'Toole's Official Site
Senator O'Toole's Legislative Website, New Jersey Legislature
New Jersey Legislature financial disclosure forms
2015 2014 2013 2012 2011 2010 2009 2008 2007 2006 2005 2004
Senator Kevin John O'Toole, Project Vote Smart
Profile at the Port Authority of New York and New Jersey
Kevin J. O'Toole at Ballotpedia
Our Campaigns – Senator Kevin J. O'Toole (NJ) profile

|-

|-

|-

|-

|-

1964 births
Living people
American mayors of Korean descent
American people of Irish descent
American politicians of Korean descent
Asian-American people in New Jersey politics
Mayors of places in New Jersey
New Jersey city council members
New Jersey lawyers
Politicians from Essex County, New Jersey
Republican Party members of the New Jersey General Assembly
Republican Party New Jersey state senators
People from Cedar Grove, New Jersey
Seton Hall University School of Law alumni
21st-century American politicians
Chairmen of the Port Authority of New York and New Jersey
Asian conservatism in the United States